George Authur Woodbridge (16 February 1907 – 31 March 1973) was an English actor who appeared in films, television, and theatre ranging from the 1930s to the 1970s. George became well known for his ruddy-cheeked complexion and West Country accent, this meant he often played publicans, policemen or yokels, most prominently in horror and comedy films alongside Christopher Lee and Peter Cushing.

Personal life
Woodbridge was born in Exeter, England, where he was raised and lived most of his life. He died in London in 1973.

Career

Woodbridge became a Chief Steward in the Merchant Navy before becoming an actor, first appearing on the London stage in 1928. He made his film debut in 1940 in The Big Blockade, he went on to appear in films such as Green for Danger (1946), The Fallen Idol (1948), The Queen of Spades (1949), Stryker of the Yard (1953), An Inspector Calls (1954), and Richard III (1955).

His horror film roles include the innkeeper in Dracula (1958) and its sequel Dracula: Prince of Darkness (1966), as well as parts in The Revenge of Frankenstein (1958), Jack the Ripper (1959), The Flesh and the Fiends (1959), The Curse of the Werewolf (1961), The Reptile (1966) and Doomwatch (1972). He also appeared in two M.R. James adaptations on television, in the Mystery and Imagination episode "Room 13" and the 1968 Omnibus episode, "Whistle and I'll Come to You".

His jovial manner lent itself to comedy films as well, including An Alligator Named Daisy (1955), Three Men in a Boat (1956), Two-Way Stretch (1960), Raising the Wind (1961), What a Carve Up! (1961), Only Two Can Play (1962), Nurse on Wheels (1963), Heavens Above! (1963), Carry On Jack (1963), Take a Girl Like You (1970), All the Way Up (1970), and Up Pompeii (1971).

He also appeared as the sergeant in the Stryker of the Yard featurettes during the 1950s.

He first appeared on television before the Second World War, and went on to appear in Jude the Obscure (1971), Adam Adamant Lives!, Armchair Theatre, Benny Hill, Dixon of Dock Green, The Forsyte Saga, The Persuaders! and Softly Softly.

He gained popularity late in his career as the titular puppet-maker in the children's TV show Inigo Pipkin. He died five weeks into the filming of the second series, an occurrence which was dealt with in the programme's storyline. The series continued for another seven years however under the title, Pipkins.

Selected filmography

 Tower of Terror (1941) - Gruppenfuhrer Rudolf Jurgens
 The Black Sheep of Whitehall (1942) - Male Nurse
 The Big Blockade (1942) - Quisling
 The Day Will Dawn (1942) - Journalist Sitting at Bar in Pub (uncredited)
 The Life and Death of Colonel Blimp (1943) - Man with Debris Clearing Unit (uncredited)
 Escape to Danger (1943) - (uncredited)
 I See a Dark Stranger (1946) - Walter
 Temptation Harbour (1947) - Frost
 Green for Danger (1947) - Det.-Sgt. Hendricks
 The October Man (1947) - Grey
 Blanche Fury (1948) - Aimes
 Escape (1948) - Farmer Browning (uncredited)
 My Brother Jonathan (1948) - Stevens
 The Red Shoes (1948) - Doorman - Covent Garden (uncredited)
 The Fallen Idol (1948) - Police Sergeant
 Silent Dust (1949) - Foreman
 The Queen of Spades (1949) - Vassili
 Children of Chance (1949) - Butcher
 Double Confession (1950) - Sgt. Sawnton
 The Black Rose (1950) - Warder (uncredited)
 The Naked Heart (1950) - Samuel Chapdelaine
 Murder in the Cathedral (1951) - 2nd Tempter
 Cloudburst (1951) - Sergeant Ritchie
 The Crimson Pirate (1952) - Pirate (uncredited)
 The Story of Gilbert and Sullivan (1953) - Reporter
 The Flanagan Boy (1953) - Police Inspector (uncredited)
 Stryker of the Yard (1953) - Sgt. Hawker
 An Inspector Calls (1954) - Fish & Chip Shop Owner
 Conflict of Wings (1954) - 'Old Circular'
 For Better, for Worse (1954) - Alf
 The Crowded Day (1954) - Mr. Bunting's Friend
 Third Party Risk (1954) - Inspector Goldfinch
 Isn't Life Wonderful! (1954) - Cockie
 The Green Carnation (1954) - Farmer
 Mad About Men (1954) - Fisherman Outside Pub (uncredited)
 Companions in Crime (1954) - Sergeant Hawker
 Passage Home (1955) - Yorkie
 The Constant Husband (1955) - Old Bailey Warder (uncredited)
 Richard III (1955) - Lord Mayor of London
 An Alligator Named Daisy (1955) - PC Jorkins (uncredited)
 A Yank in Ermine (1955) - Landlord
 Lost (1956) - Mr. Carter, garage proprietor/taxi driver (uncredited)
 Now and Forever (1956) - Policeman Charlie (uncredited)
 Eyewitness (1956) - Hospital Security Man
 Three Men in a Boat (1956) - Policeman
 The Passionate Stranger (1957) - 1st Landlord
 The Good Companions (1957) - Ripe Gentleman
 A King in New York (1957) - Member of Atomic Commission
 High Flight (1957) - Farmer
 A Tale of Two Cities (1958) - Dover Innkeeper (uncredited)
 Dracula (1958) - Landlord
 The Moonraker (1958) - Captain Lowry
 The Revenge of Frankenstein (1958) - Janitor
 The Son of Robin Hood (1958) - Little John
 Breakout (1959) - Landlord (uncredited)
 Jack the Ripper (1959) - Blake
 The Siege of Pinchgut (1959) - Newspaper Editor (uncredited)
 The Mummy (1959) - Police Constable
 Two-Way Stretch (1960) - Chief P.O. Jenkins
 The Flesh and the Fiends (1960) - Dr. Ferguson
 The Curse of the Werewolf (1961) - Dominique
 Raising the Wind (1961) - Yorkshire Orchestra Leader
 What a Carve Up! (1961) - Dr. Edward Broughton
 Only Two Can Play (1962) - Farmer (uncredited)
 The Iron Maiden (1962) - Mr. Ludge
 Nurse on Wheels (1963) - Mr. Beacon
 Heavens Above! (1963) - Bishop
 The Scarlet Blade (1963) - Town Crier (uncredited)
 Carry On Jack (1963) - Ned
 The Secret of My Success (1965) - Pub Regular (uncredited)
 Dracula: Prince of Darkness (1966) - Landlord
 Take a Girl Like You (1969) - Harry - Publican
 Where's Jack? (1969) - Hangman
 All the Way Up (1970) - Landlord
 Up Pompeii (1971) - Fat Bather
 Doomwatch (1972) - Ferry Skipper
 Diamonds on Wheels (1973) - PC Andrew

References

External links

1907 births
1973 deaths
English male stage actors
English male film actors
English male television actors
Actors from Exeter
20th-century English male actors
Male actors from Devon